Anthurium crenatum, the scalloped laceleaf, is a species of flowering plant in the family Araceae, native to the Dominican Republic, Puerto Rico, and the U.S. Virgin Islands, and introduced to the Venezuelan Antilles. With its large, textured leaves it is suitable for containers.

References

crenatum
House plants
Flora of the Dominican Republic
Flora of Puerto Rico
Flora of the United States Virgin Islands
Plants described in 1841
Flora without expected TNC conservation status